De Zwaluw (English: The swallow) is a name given to some windmills in the Netherlands:

De Zwaluw, Burdaard, in Friesland.
De Zwaluw, Hasselt, in Overijssel
De Zwaluw, Hazerswoude-Dorp in South Holland
De Zwaluw, Hoogeveen, in Drenthe
De Zwaluw, Kesteren, in Gelderland
De Zwaluw, Nieuwe-Pekela, in Groningen
De Zwaluw, Oss, in North Brabant
De Zwaluw, Oudemolen, in Drenthe
De Zwaluw, Zuurdijk, in Groningen
 De Zwaluw, former name of Zeldenrust, Oss